Fabio Valencia Cossio (born 23 March 1948) is a Colombian lawyer and politician. A Conservative party leader and politician, Valencia was first elected to Congress in 1982 as Representative for the department of Antioquia, continuing to be re-elected until 1991 when he successfully ran for Senate, where he rose to national prominence and was elected President of the Senate in 1998. In 2001, President Andrés Pastrana Arango appointed him Ambassador of Colombia to Italy with dual accreditation to Greece, Malta, San Marino, Cyprus, and the United Nations' agencies in Rome. He also served as the 4th Minister of the Interior and Justice of Colombia during the second administration of President Álvaro Uribe Vélez.

Career

Ambassadorship
On 12 January 2001 President Andrés Pastrana Arango appointed Valencia Ambassador of Colombia to Italy; on 28 February 2001 Valencia presented his Letters of Credence to President of Italy, Carlo Azeglio Ciampi, in a ceremony of protocol at the Quirinal Palace. As Ambassador of Colombia to Italy, Cassio was dually accredited as Non-Resident Ambassador to San Marino, and Malta, and as Permanent Representative the specialized organizations of the United Nations with headquarters in Rome (the Food and Agriculture Organization, the World Food Programme, and the International Fund for Agricultural Development). Valencia presented his Letters of Credence to President of Malta Guido de Marco on 18 October 2001 at the San Anton Palace in Valletta. In 2003, as part of budget cuts in the Ministry of Foreign Affairs, the Embassy of Colombia in Greece was closed, and Valencia was accredited to Greece and Cyprus to fulfil the diplomatic representation to those countries. He presented his credentials to President of Cyprus, Tassos Papadopoulos, on 21 July 2003 at the Presidential Palace in Nicosia.

On 2 June 2005, in recognition of Valencia's meritorious labour as Ambassador to Italy, he awarded the Order of Merit of the Italian Republic in the category of Knight Grand Cross by President Ciampi; he was presented the honour on 20 December by the Resident Ambassador of Italy to Colombia, Antonio Tarelli at the Italian Embassy in Bogotá.

Minister of the Interior and Justice
On 20 June 2008 President Álvaro Uribe Vélez named Valencia to succeed Carlos Holguín Sardi as Minister of the Interior and Justice of Colombia. Of his designation, Valencia said: "I will dedicate myself to the subject of justice. Minister of the Interior and Justice, more like Minister of Justice and the Interior I would say. I want to [as Minister of the Interior and Justice] institute the harmonious relation, or rather continue to institute the harmonious relationship between the other branches of government, but specially with the judicial branch". Valencia was sworn in as the 4th Minister of the Interior and Justice by President Uribe on 26 June.

Personal life
Valencia was born to Luis Eduardo Valencia García and Elvira Cossio Cuartas on 23 March 1948 in Medellín, Antioquia; he is married to María Isabel González Jaramillo who is a psychologist, and together they have four children: Juan Camilo, Catalina María, Luis Eduardo, and Santiago.

Selected works

See also
 Luis Carlos Galán Sarmiento

References

1948 births
Living people
People from Medellín
University of Antioquia alumni
20th-century Colombian lawyers
Colombian Conservative Party politicians
Members of the Chamber of Representatives of Colombia
Members of the Senate of Colombia
Presidents of the Senate of Colombia
Ambassadors of Colombia to Italy
Ambassadors of Colombia to Greece
Ambassadors of Colombia to San Marino
Ambassadors of Colombia to Cyprus
Ambassadors of Colombia to Malta
Colombian Ministers of the Interior and Justice